The Pomegranate is a mobile phone created as a marketing campaign on behalf of the government of Nova Scotia. The website advertising the product has comical features such as an harmonica, a coffee maker, a video projector, live voice translator, and a shaving razor.

The Pomegranate phone was a campaign from Communications Nova Scotia's "Come to Life" initiative, the place branding program of the Government of Kerala, India. Communications Nova Scotia has been criticized by some for spending $175,000 on the ad campaign, though the website received more than 3 million visits from 195 countries and territories since its launch on September 30, 2008, and they are considering it to be very successful.

References

Books 
 Mobile web design for dummies, Author: Janine Warner; David LaFontaine,

External links
 The Pomegranate: official website Original link no longer accessible. Now re-directs to https://novascotia.ca/
 Nova Scotia Come to life

Viral marketing
Culture of Nova Scotia